Sir Charles Stuart Taylor  (10 April 1910 – 29 March 1989) was an English businessman and Conservative politician who sat in the House of Commons from 1935 to 1974. He was the son of Alfred George Taylor and Mary Kirwan. His elder brother was Alfred Suenson-Taylor. He was educated at Epsom College, Surrey and at Trinity College, Cambridge. In 1935, he was elected as Member of Parliament (MP) for Eastbourne in East Sussex, in an unopposed by-election on 29 March following the death of Conservative MP John Slater. At the age of 25 he was the youngest member in the house. He was awarded MA from Cambridge in 1937.

Taylor fought in the Second World War in the Royal Artillery and became a Temporary Major in 1941. He was awarded the Territorial Decoration. He was managing director of Cow and Gate and later Unigate. In 1946 he became President of Grosvenor House (Park Lane) Ltd, Residential Hotels Association. He became  Deputy Lieutenant of Sussex in 1948 and was knighted in 1954. In 1958 he became Honorary Colonel in the 3rd (Sussex Battalion) Mobile Defence Corps. He was invested as a Serving Brother, Most Venerable Order of the Hospital of St John of Jerusalem.

Taylor held Eastbourne until he was de-selected by his local party prior to the February 1974 general election. He was succeeded by Ian Gow.

Taylor married actress Constance Ada Shotter, daughter of Frederick E Shotter and sister of Winifred Shotter, on 20 May 1936. They had three sons and a daughter and lived at Ratton Wood, Willingdon, Eastbourne, Sussex.

References

External links 
 

1910 births
1989 deaths
Conservative Party (UK) MPs for English constituencies
Knights Bachelor
People educated at Epsom College
Alumni of Trinity College, Cambridge
UK MPs 1931–1935
UK MPs 1935–1945
UK MPs 1945–1950
UK MPs 1950–1951
UK MPs 1951–1955
UK MPs 1955–1959
UK MPs 1959–1964
UK MPs 1964–1966
UK MPs 1966–1970
UK MPs 1970–1974
British Army personnel of World War II
Royal Artillery officers